The 2017 Henderson mayoral election was held on April 4, 2017 to elect the mayor of Henderson, Nevada. It saw the election of Debra March.

Results

References 

Henderson
Mayoral elections in Henderson, Nevada
Henderson